Maud or Maude (approximately pronounced  in English), is an Old German name meaning "powerful battler". It is a variant of the given name Matilda but is uncommon as a surname. The Welsh variant of this name is Mawd.

The name's popularity in 19th-century England is associated with Alfred Tennyson's poem Maud.

People with the name include

Royalty 

Maud, 2nd Countess of Huntingdon (1074–1130), daughter of Waltheof, Earl of Northumbria and heir to his earldom of Huntingdon
Empress Matilda, (1102–1169), also known as "Mahaut", "Maud" or "Maude", daughter of King Henry I of England and mother to King Henry II of England
Princess Maud of Fife (1893–1945), member of the British Royal Family
Maud of Savoy (1125–1158), first Queen Consort of Portugal
Maud of Wales (1869–1938), also known as "Maud, Queen of Norway", a member of the British Royal Family

Other 

Maud Adams (born 1945), Swedish actress
Maud (fictional), supporting protagonist of the webcomic Acception
Maud Gonne (1866–1953), English-born Irish revolutionary, feminist, actress and long time poetic inspiration to William Butler Yeats
Maud Hawinkels (born 1976), Dutch television presenter
Maud Lewis (1903-1970), Canadian folk artist
Maud Menten (1879–1960), Canadian physician-scientist who made significant contributions to enzyme kinetics and histochemistry
Maud Meyer, Sierra Leonean Nigerian jazz singer
Maud Mulder (born 1981), Dutch singer
Maud Naftel (1856-1891), English watercolour painter
Maud Olivier (born 1953), French politician
Maud Pie (fictional), older sister of Pinkie Pie from the My Little Pony: Friendship Is Magic episode of the same name
Maud Powell (1867–1920), American violinist

References

See also
Matilda (disambiguation)
Maude (disambiguation)
Maudie (disambiguation)
Princess Maud (disambiguation)
Queen Maud (disambiguation)

Given names
Feminine given names
French feminine given names
English feminine given names
Welsh feminine given names
Scottish feminine given names